The Parque de la Independencia (Independence Park) is a large public park in Rosario, . It is located near the geographical center of the city, its limits defined by Moreno Street and three important avenues: Pellegrini Avenue, Ovidio Lagos Avenue, and 27 de Febrero Boulevard.

It includes a number of attractions:

 The Rosedal (Rose Garden), finished in 1915, with several species of roses, as well as sculptures and fountains.
 The French Garden, built in 1942, with many flower arrangements and a large marble fountain.
 The Calendar, where every evening since 1946 gardeners re-arrange the flowers to show the date written on the ground.
 An area reserved for fairs, initially intended for agricultural expositions, then also industry and commerce.
 The former Rosario Jockey Club's horsetrack.
 The Museum of the City, opened in 1902, initially the School of Gardener Apprentices.
 The Jorge Newbery Municipal Stadium, started in 1925, the first state-funded sports venue for public use in the country. It hosted the 2005 South American Junior Championships in Athletics.
 The Patinódromo Municipal "Roberto Tagliabué" (Municipal Skating Rink), opened for the 1982 Southern Cross Games and host of the 2014 Inline speed skating World Championship. 
 The Juan B. Castagnino Fine Arts Museum, opened in 1937.
 The Dr. Julio Marc Provincial Historical Museum, opened in 1939.

The park also hosts three sports clubs: Club Gimnasia y Esgrima, Club Atlético Newell's Old Boys (one of the main football teams in the city),
Club Atlético Provincial.

History
The Parque de la Independencia was the first park in the city. Its origin lies in four public squares at the intersection of two then newly opened large boulevards, Santafesino and Argentino (today Oroño Boulevard and Pellegrini Avenue). The four-part plaza was named Independencia.

In 1900 the provincial government authorized the municipality, presided by mayor Luis Lamas, to expropriate the lands to create a new park. The plans for the park were drawn by landscape architect Carlos Thays (famous for his work in the Buenos Aires Botanical Garden, among many others). In 1901 the municipality built the internal avenues and roads, an artificial lake and, with the earth removed for the lake, a small artificial hill (even today known as La Montañita, the Little Mountain). That year, also, the First Festival of the Tree took place, and 6,000 trees were planted by students in the park, which was inaugurated on 1 January 1902.

References

External links

  Municipality of Rosario

Independencia
Independencia